Milord is an Italian compilation by Dalida. It contains her Italy's Top 10 hits like "Milord", "Gli zingari", "Uno a te uno a me" (also as "I ragazzi del Pireo"), and "Pezzettini di bikini".

Track listing 
Barclay & Jolly Hi-Fi Records – LPJ 5018,

See also 
 Dalida albums discography

References

Sources 

Dalida albums
1961 albums
Italian-language albums
Barclay (record label) albums